

n
N.E.E.

na

nab-nad
nabazenil (INN)
nabilone (INN)
nabitan (INN)
nabiximols (USAN)
naboctate (INN)
nabumetone (INN)
nacartocin (INN)
nacolomab tafenatox (INN)
nadide (INN)
nadifloxacin (INN)
nadolol (INN)
nadoxolol (INN)
nadroparin calcium (INN)

naf

nafa-nafo
nafagrel (INN)
nafamostat (INN)
nafarelin (INN)
Nafazair (Bausch & Lomb)
nafazatrom (INN)
nafcaproic acid (INN)
nafcillin (INN)
nafenodone (INN)
nafenopin (INN)
nafetolol (INN)
nafimidone (INN)
nafiverine (INN)
naflocort (INN)
nafomine (INN)
nafoxadol (INN)
nafoxidine (INN)

naft
naftalofos (INN)
naftazone (INN)
naftidrofuryl (INN)
naftifine (INN)
Naftin (Merz Pharma)
naftopidil (INN)
naftoxate (INN)
naftypramide (INN)

nag-nan
naglivan (INN)
nagrestipen (INN)
nalbuphine (INN)
Nalfon (Xspire Pharma)
nalfurafine hydrochloride (USAN)
nalidixic acid (INN)
Nallpen (GlaxoSmithKline)
nalmefene (INN)
nalmexone (INN)
nalorphine (INN)
naloxone (INN)
naltrexone (INN)
naluzotan (USAN, INN)
Namenda (Forest Laboratories)
naminidil (USAN)
naminterol (INN)
namirotene (INN)
namoxyrate (INN)
nanafrocin (INN)
nandrolone (INN)
nanofin (INN)
nanterinone (INN)
nantradol (INN)

nap-naq
napactadine (INN)
napamezole (INN)
naphazoline (INN)
Naphcon Forte
Naphcon-A (Alcon)
naphthonone (INN)
napirimus (INN)
napitane (INN)
Naprelan (Blansett Pharmacal)
naprodoxime (INN)
Naprosyn (Syntex)
naproxcinod (USAN)
naproxen (INN)
naproxol (INN)
napsagatran (INN)
naptumomab estafenatox (INN)
Naqua (Bial)
Naquival (Bayer Schering Pharma)

nar-nav
narafilcon (USAN)
naranol (INN)
narasin (INN)
naratriptan (INN)
Narcan
nardeterol (INN)
Nardil
narlaprevir (USAN, INN)
naroparcil (INN)
Naropin
nartograstim (INN)
Nasacort (Sanofi-Aventis) redirects to triamcinolone
Nasalcrom
Nasalide
Nasarel
nasaruplase (INN)
nasaruplase beta (INN)
Nascobal
Nasonex
Natacyn
natalizumab (INN)
natamycin (INN)
nateglinide (INN)
nateplase (INN)
Natrecor
Naturetin
Navane
naveglitazar (USAN)
Navelbine (GlaxoSmithKline)
navitoclax (USAN)

nax
naxagolide (INN)
naxaprostene (INN)
naxifylline (USAN)